Khanom tan is a popular Thai dessert consisting of small steamed cakes flavoured with toddy palm sugar and coconut milk, wrapped in banana leaves, and topped with grated coconut. It is most often found in the provinces where sugar palm is grown, such as Phetchaburi, Nakhon Pathom and Suphanburi.

History
Khanom Tan is one of many popular Thai desserts that dates from the  Sukhothai period. During that time, the main ingredients used in preparing desserts were rice flour, sugar and coconut, in contrast to desserts from the later  Ayutthaya period, which are based on a mixture of eggs and sugar. Today, Khanom Tan is not well known among younger generations due to its disappearance from street markets, but it is still a popular Thai dessert outside of the Bangkok area.

Preparation

Khanom tan is made using a similar technique to the steamed dessert khanom kluay, the key difference being that khanom tan requires the batter to be fermented to achieve a spongy texture. Khanom tan is made from coconut milk, rice flour, a raising agent and toddy palm fruit (palm sugar). Toddy palm fruit is rich in vitamins A and C, has a strong smell when crushed, and is juicy and soft, similar to lychee.

Ingredients 
   4 and ½ cups of rice flour
	1 cup of ripe sugar palm fruit (squeeze the meat)
	4 and ½ cups of coconut milk
	3 cups of sugar
	3 cups of scraped coconut (overripe)
	1 tsp. salt 
	1/2 tbsp. baking powder.

How to cook
Crush the sugar palm fruit with water in a bowl.
Put all of the juice in a filter cloth bag and squeeze.
Leave it in the refrigerator for 24 hours.
Boil coconut milk with sugar.
When it's boiling, turn off the fire and leave it cool off.
In a big bowl, mix sugar palm meat from step1 with rice flour and coconut milk from step2.
Knead well. Make sure it is really soft.
Leave it outside for 4 hours.
Put wet white cloth over top.
Cut banana leaves and shape into a small cup
Pour the mixture into the banana leaf cups, or ceramic cups if you can't make one.
Mix scraped coconut with salt and dress it over top the cake.
Steam over boiling water for 15 minutes.

See also 
 Thai cuisine 
 List of Thai desserts
 List of Thai dishes (includes names in Thai script)

References 

Thai desserts and snacks